Thomas R. Fortune (February 8, 1917 – December 30, 1986) was an American politician who served in the New York State Assembly from the 55th district from 1969 to 1982.

He died on December 30, 1986, in Brooklyn, New York City, New York at age 69.

References

1917 births
1986 deaths
Democratic Party members of the New York State Assembly
20th-century American politicians